Orhan Brandt (1890 – 22 July 1974) was a Turkish philatelist who was added to the Roll of Distinguished Philatelists in 1958.

References

Signatories to the Roll of Distinguished Philatelists
1890 births
1974 deaths
Turkish philatelists
Philately of Turkey